Jimmy Flemion is a founding member, with his older brother Dennis Flemion, of controversial independent rock band The Frogs. Jimmy is mostly the lead singer and guitarist for the group. He has been known to play solo shows with just an acoustic guitar.

In 1996, the brothers toured with The Smashing Pumpkins on the Mellon Collie and the Infinite Sadness Tour. During the encores of "1979", Jimmy, clad with a silver bat-winged suit, would pick members of the audience to dance onstage.

The brothers Flemion also appeared on the Pumpkins' "Medellia of the Gray Skies" on the band's single, Tonight, Tonight. On Adore, the brothers backed vocals for "To Sheila" and "Behold! The Night-Mare".

See also
Bring 'Em Bach Alive!
The Last Hard Men

External links
 https://web.archive.org/web/20080517172018/http://www.thefrogsarchive.com/bio.html
 https://web.archive.org/web/20081204163443/http://citypages.com/databank/22/1077/article9723.asp

References

Living people
Year of birth missing (living people)
American rock guitarists
The Last Hard Men (band) members